Badr-A (meaning Full Moon-A) was the first artificial and the first digital communications satellite launched by Pakistan's national space authority — the SUPARCO — in 1990. The Badr-A was Pakistan's first indigenously developed and manufactured digital communications and an experimental artificial satellite which was launched into low Earth orbit by Pakistan on 16 July 1990, through a Chinese carrier rocket. The launch ushered new military, technological, and scientific developments in Pakistan and also provided data on radio-signal distribution in the ionosphere. Originally planned to be launched from the United States in 1986, the Challenger disaster furthered delayed the launch of the satellite which changed the plan. After the People's Republic of China offered Pakistan to use its facility, the Badr-A was finally launched from Xichang Satellite Launch Center in 1990 on Long March 2E. The Badr-A successfully completed its designed life, and a new satellite was proposed to be developed.

Before the launch 
The history of the Badr-A project dated back to 1979, when Indian Space Research Organisation (ISRO) successfully launched her first satellite, Aryabhata in year 1975. After four years, on 13 December 1979, Munir Ahmad Khan managed a cabinet-level meeting with Chief Martial Law Administrator General Muhammad Zia-ul-Haq and gained Suparco's status as an executive authority. In 1981, Salim Mehmud addressed Munir Ahmad Khan proposing the development of an Earth-orbiting artificial satellite, the task previously achieved by India. Munir Ahmad Khan took the matter to General Zia-ul-Haq who gave approval of this project. As part of the development of this project, Suparco sent a number of its engineers to University of Surrey to participate in the development of UO-11 which was launched in 1984. After participating in various projects with University of Surrey, the team returned to Pakistan in 1986. Munir Ahmad Khan then returned to General Zia-ul-Haq and obtained his approval to begin practical work on Badr-1. The project was started by Suparco's Dr. Salim Mehmud as director of the project and was supported by the members of Pakistan Amateur Radio Society. The Suparco began building the satellite at the Instrumentation Laboratories (IL), with Dr. Muhammad Riaz Suddle serving as its project manager. This project was called "Project Badr" and the Project Badr was initially funded financially by Ministry of Telecommunications and the Ministry of Science. In short span of time, the Project Badr was completed, and the first satellite was named Badr-1.

Design
The technical director of Badr-1 was dr. Salim Mehmud, Director of SUPARCO and the project was overseen by Dr. Muhammad Riaz Suddle, who served as its project manager. The satellite was slightly bigger than Soviet Sputnik 1 satellite in size. The Badr-1 was an indigenously built and developed satellite of Pakistan. The major contractor was Instrumentation Laboratories and the Pakistan Amateur Radio Society, supported by Ministry of Science and the Ministry of Telecommunications. The satellite shaped as a polyhedron with 26 surfaces or facets, was about 20 inches in diameter. The polyhedrons, covered with highly polished heat shield, made of aluminium-magnesium-titanium. The satellite carried two antennas designed by Instrumentation Laboratories. The power supply, with a mass of 52 kg. The satellite was powered with solar power panels with a 12.5 W electricity. The satellite was designed in SUPARCO's Satellite Research and Development Center in Lahore. The satellite had one radio channel for digital store-and-forward communications.

A transponder uplink was near 435 MHz, and the downlink was near 145 MHz. The telemetry beacon was near 145 MHz. Data from 32 telemetry channels, including information from 9 temperature sensors, 16 current sensors, and 5 voltage sensors, was stored in an 8k memory bank and transmitted at 1200, 600, 300 and 150 baud.<reference doesn't contain this info>Originally designed for a circular orbit at 250–300 miles' altitude, Badr-1 actually was inserted by the Long March rocket into an elliptical orbit of 127–615 miles. The cost of development and preparation of satellite was no more than Rs. 1.2 million.<reference doesn't contain this information >

Launch vehicle preparation and launch site selection

The SUPARCO negotiated with the National Aeronautics and Space Administration (NASA) for the launch of the satellite and approval required from the United States Government for the launch of the Badr-1. The Air Force Strategic Command decided to fly the satellite by using one of its C-130 aircraft in 1986 to Florida, United States. The Delta 3000 was selected by NASA's administration as its launch vehicle. Preparation was made and its crew and satellite was stored at the aircraft, however, it was delayed due to unknown reasons. The Badr-1 was never shipped to United States and its launch was delayed for until next four years. As aftermath of the Challenger disaster in 1986, the United States Government and NASA had halt all the flights of the rockets carrying spacecraft and satellite payloads until the investigations were thoroughly completed. The satellite was stored at the Instrumentation Laboratories (IL) and SUPARCO began to negotiate with other space powers. In 1990, representatives of Chinese government offered Government of Pakistan to launch the satellite on one of its Long March Rockets and its facility. SUPARCO did not want to wait any longer, therefore, the Air Force Strategic Command flew the satellite, in sub-assembly form, to People's Republic of China. The satellite was re-assembled by Air Force Strategic Command and Suparco's official who visited the Xichang Satellite Launch Center. The satellite was load at the Launch Area 2 and final preparations were made. The Chinese Government used Long March 2E, a three-stage orbital carrier rocket designed to commercial communications satellites, to launch the Badr-1 who also took its first maiden flight with the launch of Badr-1 on 16 July 1990.

Launch and mission
On 16 July 1990, the Badr-1 was launched as a secondary payload on a Long March 2E rocket from Area No. 2 at XSLC. Badr-1, a low-Earth orbit satellite, circled the Earth's orbit every 96 minutes, passing over Pakistan for 15 minutes three to four times a day. Scientists, engineers, technicians, and designers who developed the satellite watched the launch from range. They waited about 93 minutes to ensure that the satellite had made one orbit and was transmitting, before dr. M. Shafi Ahmad called Prime minister Benazir Bhutto. The downlink telemetry included data on temperatures inside and on the surface of the sphere. The satellite itself, a small but highly polished polyhedron, was barely visible at sixth magnitude, and thus more difficult to follow optically. The satellite completed its designated life successfully. On the first orbit, the Suparco globally announced the launch of the satellite, and the Science ministry confirmed the launch of the satellite. As the satellite completed its life, a new project was launched, more ambitious, advanced, and difficult than Badr-1. However, even after the Badr-1I was completed, the satellite could not be able to launch until 2001.

Achievement
With the successful development and launch of the Badr-1, Pakistan became the first Muslim country, and second South Asian country after India, to place a satellite in orbit. The satellite gave Pakistani scientists an academic, scientific, and an amateur community experience in telemetry, tracking, control and data communications as the satellite successfully completed store and dump message tests for 5 weeks.

Despite the international success gained, the Pakistans' accomplishments were kept quiet in the homeland to prevent any exploitation of their failures or loss of secrets, which undermined the propaganda opportunity. The Pakistan Television, a state-controlled media authority, announced the first launch in televisions never made a headline, and only fewer details were projected. The Badr-1 crushed the global perception that the country had not space program, and the space program was only dedicated to its military applications. The launch of the satellite united the people of Pakistan, and scientists who were involved in this project, were bestowed with national honours in public, and increased the pride of Pakistan.

The satellite formed the derivatives and the basis of the Badr-B satellite. The Badr-B was more sophisticated than Badr-l, with a CCD camera for pictures of Earth and a system that allowed ground stations to change the satellite's direction in space.

Mission goals
 acquiring know-how for indigenous development of satellites
 creating an infrastructure for future satellite development activities
 testing the performance of indigenously developed satellite subsystems in space environment
 performing experiments in real-time voice and data communications between two user ground stations
 demonstrating store-and-forward type message communication
 educating the country's academic, scientific and amateur community in the tracking and use of low-earth-orbiting satellites

Technical configuration

See also

 Badr-B
 Badr (satellite)
 Space and Upper Atmosphere Research Commission

References

External links
 Official SUPARCO site
 Space Today writeup
 ARRL site

Satellites formerly orbiting Earth
Badr satellites
Space programme of Pakistan
History of science and technology in Pakistan
First artificial satellites of a country
Government of Benazir Bhutto
China–Pakistan relations
Spacecraft launched in 1990